In the classical central-force problem of classical mechanics, some potential energy functions  produce motions or orbits that can be expressed in terms of well-known functions, such as the trigonometric functions and elliptic functions.  This article describes these functions and the corresponding solutions for the orbits.

General problem

Let . Then the Binet equation for  can be solved numerically for nearly any central force . The solution for  can be expressed as an integral over 

A central-force problem is said to be "integrable" if this integration can be solved in terms of known functions.

If the force is a power law, i.e., if , then  can be expressed in terms of circular functions and/or elliptic functions if  equals 1, -2, -3 (circular functions) and -7, -5, -4, 0, 3, 5, -3/2, -5/2, -1/3, -5/3 and -7/3 (elliptic functions).

If the force is the sum of an inverse quadratic law and a linear term, i.e., if , the problem also is solved explicitly in terms of Weierstrass elliptic functions.

References

Bibliography

 
 

Classical mechanics